Gemeses is a civil parish in the municipality of Esposende, Portugal.

Notable people
Paulo Gonçalves (1979–2020), motorcyclist

References

Parishes of Esposende